The Russian Biographical Dictionary (RBD) is a Russian-language biographical dictionary published by the Russian Historian Society edited by a collective with Alexander Polovtsov as the editor-in-chief. The dictionary was published in 25 volumes from 1896 to 1918 and considered one of the most comprehensive Russian biographical sources for the 19th and early 20th century period.

External links 

  Online version

Russian biographical dictionaries
1896 non-fiction books
Reference works in the public domain